Takuya Tsuda (津田 拓也, born 27 April 1984) is a Japanese motorcycle racer. He has been Suzuki's primary test rider since it returned to MotoGP in 2015. Tsuda made his MotoGP debut in the 2017 Spanish Grand Prix at Jerez in place of the injured Alex Rins.

Career statistics

Grand Prix motorcycle racing

By season

By class

Races by year
(key) (Races in bold indicate pole position, races in italics indicate fastest lap)

References

External links

Profile on gpupdate.net

1984 births
Living people
Japanese motorcycle racers
Suzuki MotoGP riders
MotoGP World Championship riders